Spooky Valentine is a 2012 Philippine television drama romance horror anthology broadcast by GMA Network. It premiered on February 4, 2012 replacing Spooky Nights. The show concluded on February 25, 2012 with a total of 4 episodes.

Premise
In Spooky Valentine, a story with a slightly scary theme runs for a number of weeks and is replaced by a new one with a different cast once it finishes.

Episodes

"Maestra"

"Masahista"

"Manibela"

"Manikurista"

Ratings
According to AGB Nielsen Philippines' Mega Manila household television ratings, the pilot episode of Spooky Valentine earned a 20.5% rating. While the final episode scored a 19.9% rating.

References

2012 Philippine television series debuts
2012 Philippine television series endings
Filipino-language television shows
GMA Network original programming
Philippine anthology television series
Television shows set in the Philippines